Rafael L. Silva (born June 18, 1994) is a Brazilian-American actor best known for his role as Carlos Reyes in 9-1-1: Lone Star.

Biography
Silva was born in Belo Horizonte, Brazil. When he was little, he wanted to pursue a career in animal care, just like his grandfather and his uncles. However, his family moved to the United States when he was thirteen years old. Silva was hit by a culture shock that resulted in him becoming introverted and becoming fearful when speaking in public.

He started acting while in high school to overcome his fear. “I started acting when I was a junior in high school. I used to be very afraid to speak in public. I figured if you were going to be afraid of something, you might as well be in the eye of the hurricane. So I started acting because I was afraid of speaking in public...”
After graduating from Pace University, he made appearances in Madam Secretary and Fluidity.

Personal life
Silva is a Brazilian jiu-jitsu practitioner, having trained with Royce Gracie. He also dances and is fluent in English, Spanish, and Portuguese.

He is openly gay.

Filmography

References

External links

1994 births
Actors of Brazilian descent
Brazilian expatriates in the United States
Brazilian practitioners of Brazilian jiu-jitsu 
Brazilian male television actors
Brazilian LGBT actors
LGBT Brazilian jiu-jitsu practitioners

Living people